Linda e il brigadiere is an Italian television series.

Cast
Nino Manfredi: Nino Fogliani
Claudia Koll: Linda Fogliani (1-2)
Caterina Deregibus: Linda (3)
Michael Reale: Pierre Torrigiani
Franca Valeri: Olga, Pierre's mother (3) 
 Renato De Carmine: Piperno

See also
List of Italian television series

External links
 

Italian television series
1997 Italian television series debuts
2000 Italian television series endings
RAI original programming